Evan Benjamin Gareth Jones (born 1937) is a British mycologist. His main area of research interest is aquatic fungi, particularly marine fungi. He has supervised about 100 PhD and MSc students, published approximately 600 research articles and is a highly cited scientist. Other research interests include marine biofouling, biodeterioration of materials, and wood decay by fungi.

Jones earned a PhD from the University of Leeds in 1963, where his supervisors were Irene Manton and David Jennings.

Recognition
In 2016, an issue of the scientific journal Mycosphere was dedicated to him in honour of his 80th birthday in January 2017. Many species have been named in his honour. The eponyms include Arthrinium garethjonesii ; Brunneodinemasporium jonesii ; Chaetosphaeria garethjonesii ; Cookeina garethjonesii ; Cymostachys garethjonesii ; Dictyocheirospora garethjonesii ; Melanochaeta garethjonesii ; Montagnula jonesii ; Muyocopron garethjonesii ; Neoleptosphaeria jonesii ; Neooccultibambusa jonesii ; Neorhamphoria garethjonesii ; Oxydothis garethjonesii ; Parafuscosporella garethii ; Phragmocephala garethjonesii ; Poaceicola garethjonesii ; and Tainosphaeria jonesii .

References

1937 births
Living people
Alumni of the University of Leeds
British mycologists